Dwight Global Online School is an online independent school for students in sixth through twelfth grade. It is part of the Dwight Global Schools Network.

The original Dwight School was founded in Manhattan in 1872. In 2013, it was chosen to pilot an online IB education program that became Dwight Global Online School.

Academics
Classes are a mix of synchronous and asynchronous elements, designed to suit a student body, including young athletes and actors, who want a rigorous education that is time-flexible. 

Dwight Global is an IB World School and offers AP classes. Students choose to either focus on IB, AP, or a personalized course of study, meeting the same graduation standards as the students in the other Dwight schools. They graduate with a Dwight Global diploma and can pursue an IB diploma. They may come to the school's traditional campuses in New York City, Shanghai, Seoul, London, and Dubai for residential programs.

In 2021, Niche ranked Dwight Global the second-best online high school in the United States.

Notable alumni
 Rowan Blanchard, '19, actress
 Lilla Crawford, '19, actress
 Gregory Diaz IV, actor and singer
 Jaden Michael, actor
 Yara Shahidi, '17, actress

External links
 School website

References

Educational institutions established in 2014
Online schools in the United States
2014 establishments in the United States